The outcrop rainbow-skink (Liburnascincus mundivensis) is an endemic species of lizard that inhabits Queensland, Australia. It is named after the type locality whose name (”Muldiva”) is a corruption of the aboriginal name for the creek Mundiva.

References

Liburnascincus
Skinks of Australia
Endemic fauna of Australia
Reptiles described in 1898
Taxa named by Robert Broom